Rajnagar Assembly constituency is an assembly constituency in Madhubani district in the Indian state of Bihar. It is reserved for scheduled castes.

Overview
As per Delimitation of Parliamentary and Assembly constituencies Order, 2008, No. 37  Rajnagar Assembly constituency is composed of the following: Rajnagar and Andhratharhi community development blocks.

Rajnagar Assembly constituency is part of No. 7 Jhanjharpur (Lok Sabha constituency).

Members of Legislative Assembly

Election results

2020 

In the Bihar Legislative Assembly election 2015 communist party of India ( CPI )  won Rajnagar seat by defeating his nearest rival Ramavtar Paswan of RJD .

References

External links
 

Assembly constituencies of Bihar
Politics of Madhubani district